Several companies, most prominently the Metropolitan Transportation Authority (MTA), operate a number of bus routes in Manhattan, New York, United States. Many of them are the direct descendants of streetcar lines (see list of streetcar lines in Manhattan).



Companies
Presently, the New York City Transit Authority and its subsidiary Manhattan and Bronx Surface Transit Operating Authority operate most local buses in Manhattan. The Roosevelt Island Operating Corporation operates the Roosevelt Island Red Bus Service.

The first bus company in Manhattan was the Fifth Avenue Coach Company, which began operating the Fifth Avenue Line (now the M1 route) in 1886. When New York Railways began abandoning several streetcar lines in 1919, the replacement bus routes (including the current M21 and M22 routes) were picked up by the New York City Department of Plant and Structures (DP&S). The DP&S began operating several other buses (including the current M79 and M96 routes) in 1921. All of these but the M21 were acquired by Green Bus Lines in 1933; Green transferred several of these to the Comprehensive Omnibus Corporation in 1935.

The New York City Omnibus Corporation began operating replacement routes for New York Railways lines abandoned in 1936, and acquired the remaining Green routes. They also acquired the Madison Avenue Coach Company (former New York and Harlem Railroad lines), Eighth Avenue Coach Corporation (former Eighth and Ninth Avenue Railways lines), and in 1942 the Triangle Bus Corporation (current M21 route).

In 1936, the NYCO and Fifth Avenue were placed under common ownership. The two were merged directly by 1956, when the NYCO acquired the Surface Transportation Corporation (which had operated former Third Avenue Railway routes since 1941), and changed its name to Fifth Avenue Coach Lines. After a strike, the entire Fifth Avenue system was transferred to the newly formed Manhattan and Bronx Surface Transit Operating Authority on March 22, 1962.

In 1933, two related companies began to operate routes: the Comprehensive Omnibus Corporation gained several Green Bus Lines routes (including the current M22, M27, and M50 routes), and the East Side Omnibus Corporation started operating former Second Avenue Railroad routes (including the current M15 and M31 routes). The Comprehensive also started the current M66 route that year, and in 1948 the New York City Board of Transportation acquired the Comprehensive and East Side routes, transferred to the New York City Transit Authority in 1953. The M9 route came from the Avenue B and East Broadway Transit Company in 1980, which had begun operating replacement routes for the Dry Dock, East Broadway and Battery Railroad lines in 1932.

Routes
This table gives details for the routes prefixed with "M"—in other words, those considered to run primarily in Manhattan by the MTA. For details on routes with other prefixes, see the following articles:
List of bus routes in the Bronx: 
List of bus routes in Brooklyn: 
List of bus routes in Queens: 
List of express bus routes in New York City: all routes
List of bus routes in Westchester County: 

Connections to New York City Subway stations at the bus routes' terminals are also listed where applicable.

New York City Bus
Most bus routes do not operate overnight, usually defined as midnight to 5:00 AM. Routes that do provide overnight service are noted below with an asterisk (*).

The Manhattan bus routes should not be confused with Megabus routes originating from Manhattan. Like the Manhattan bus routes, Megabus route designations consist of the letter "M" followed by a number.

All routes in operate local service; additional limited-stop or Select Bus Service routes are noted below.

New York Waterway
New York Waterway operates shuttle bus routes to/from its West Midtown Ferry Terminal, located at 38th Street and Twelfth Avenue. Service is free.

Peak service

Off-peak service
All routes operate as clockwise loops.

NYC Ferry
A clockwise "loop" bus via 34th Street, Sixth Avenue, 48th Street, and Lexington Avenue operates during peak hours to/from East 34th Street Ferry Landing.

Roosevelt Island Operating Corporation

Downtown Connection 

In Lower Manhattan a free shuttle, sponsored by the Lower Manhattan Business Improvement District (BID), operates minibuses daily from 10:00 AM until 7:30 PM.

History of the current Manhattan bus routes

Routes M1 to M20

Routes M21 to M79

Routes M86 to M125

2020s redesign
As part of the MTA's 2017 Fast Forward Plan to speed up mass transit service, a draft plan for a reorganization of Bronx bus routes was proposed in draft format in June 2019, with a final version published in October 2019. Many of the draft proposals were not included in the final version. These changes were set to take effect in mid-2020, but delayed due to the COVID-19 pandemic in New York City. These changes include modifications to the M100 route in Manhattan as well as the addition of a crosstown M125 bus route. The redesign took effect on June 26, 2022.

Former routes
Except for early Fifth Avenue Coach Company routes, which were approved by the New York Legislature, all routes were assigned a franchise by the city, numbered in order from M1 to at least M47 and M100 to M106. Most companies used these numbers, but the New York City Omnibus Corporation (NYCOC) gave its routes numbers from 1 to 22, and the Fifth Avenue Coach Company used numbers from 1 to 20. The public designations were not changed to avoid conflicts until July 1, 1974.

Fifth Avenue Coach Company

New York City Omnibus Corporation

Other companies

Renumbered or eliminated routes since 1962

References

External links

Chicago Transit & Railfan Web Site: New York City Transit
www.nycsubway.org: Local Bus Companies of Manhattan

 
Bus routes in Manhattan
Transportation in Manhattan
Manhattan
Lists of New York City bus routes